Montblanc is the capital of the Catalan comarca Conca de Barberà, in the Spanish province of Tarragona. The Prades Mountains are located in the vicinity of this town.

The municipality comprises the settlements of Montblanc (2013 population 7,027), La Guàrdia dels Prats (200), Lilla (88), Prenafeta (61), Rojals (26), and El Pinetell (7).

History
The area around Montblanc has been inhabited for thousands of years.  Evidence of cave dwellings have been found dating back to Palaeolithic times.

From the 4th to the 1st century BC Iberian villages existed on Santa Bàrbara hill.  These villages coexisted with the early Roman settlers.  Evidence of Roman artifacts have been found which date from between the 2nd century BC to the 2nd century AD.

After the invasion by the Moors in 711 AD, much of the area became dominated by a patchwork of Islamic fiefdoms.  The Islamic invasion initiated a long period of very successful agricultural and commercial development. This was responsible for the birth of many towns and villages in the region which still retain their Islamic names.

The 10th and 11th centuries seem to have been a period of relatively peaceful coexistence in which Muslims, Christians and Jews lived in the region of Montblanc.  This productive period continued until an allegiance of  forces, strongly supported by the Roman Catholic Church, initiated an era of expulsions, which forced Muslims and Jews to leave the Iberian peninsula.

Maties Palau Ferré (1921-2000), painter and sculptor, disciple of Pablo Picasso, was born and died in Montblanc.

Main sights
Convent of Sant Francesc, established around 1238. The church is in Romanesque-Gothic style.
Gothic church of Santa Maria (14th century)
Church of Sant Miquel

Twin towns
 Montblanc, France

References

External links 

Official website 
 Government data pages 

Municipalities in Conca de Barberà